Entail may refer to:

 Fee tail, a term of art in common law describing a limited form of succession
 Entailment, a logical relation between sentences of a formal language
Entailment (linguistics), the use of the term in linguistics
 In architecture (obsolete), an ornamental device sunk in the ground of stone or brass, and subsequently filled in with marble, mosaic or enamel: see inlay